Buravtsovka is a rural locality (a village) and the administrative center of Buravtsovskoye Rural Settlement, Ertilsky District, Voronezh Oblast, Russia. The population was 402 as of 2010. There are 3 streets.

Geography 
Buravtsovka is located 25 km southeast of Ertil (the district's administrative centre) by road. Begichevo is the nearest rural locality.

References 

Rural localities in Ertilsky District